Žemaičių Kalvarija eldership is an eldership in Plungė District Municipality, Lithuania to the northeast from Plungė. The administrative center is Žemaičių Kalvarija.

Largest towns and villages 
Žemaičių Kalvarija 
Gegrėnai 
Rotinėnai
Šarnelė 
Virkšai 
Jazdauskiškiai

Other villages

References 

Elderships in Plungė District Municipality